Deep Throat was a professional wrestling pay-per-view (PPV) event produced by Frontier Martial-Arts Wrestling (FMW). The event took place on November 12, 2000 at the Bunka Gym in Yokohama, Kanagawa, Japan.

Ten matches were contested at the event. In the main event, Kodo Fuyuki successfully defended the WEW World Heavyweight Championship against Hayabusa with a running lariat. Hayabusa would take a hiatus after the match due to injury and announced that he would return to FMW at 12th Anniversary Show. In other major matches, Tetsuhiro Kuroda defeated Mr. Gannosuke in a match, which stipulated that Gannosuke must retire if he lost and Kintaro Kanemura successfully defended the WEW Hardcore Championship against Masato Tanaka.

Reception
Stuart of Puroresu Central gave negative reviews to the event, with "It turned into a good show after the awful match with XPW scrubs involved, but the sheer quantity of junk before that really damages the show as a whole. Looking past that stuff, the good part not only had the better wrestler, but maybe coincidentally, maybe not, had better booked angles than some of the bush league crap on the undercard. GOEMON vs. Onryo is goofy in theory, but I dug the uniqueness of it. Gannosuke vs. Kuroda was one mans fight to save FMW from the evil of show puroresu (sports-entertainment), although he failed and got retired (for now). Kanemura vs. Tanaka had no real storyline in the modern FMW sense that I picked up on, it was just a war between two old rivals, who turned the clock back a few years and left the current era for just under 18 minutes. And the main event concluded, for now, the ongoing saga between Hayabusa and Fuyuki, with Fuyuki hinting at a full babyface turn at the end, especially with Kuroda turning heel. Even though those were better booked than the undercard stuff, the constant turns, swerves and what have you seemed to jade many fans, which probably contributed to the bad attendance."

Results

References

2000 in professional wrestling
Frontier Martial-Arts Wrestling shows
2000 in Japan
Events in Yokohama
Professional wrestling in Yokohama
November 2000 events in Japan